The 2022 República Dominicana Open was a professional tennis tournament played on green clay courts. It was the sixth edition of the tournament which was part of the 2022 ATP Challenger Tour. It took place in Santo Domingo, Dominican Republic between 15 and 21 August 2022.

Singles main-draw entrants

Seeds

 1 Rankings were as of 8 August 2022.

Other entrants
The following players received wildcards into the singles main draw:
  Peter Bertran
  Gonzalo Bueno
  Nick Hardt

The following players received entry into the singles main draw as alternates:
  Gonzalo Lama
  Roberto Quiroz
  Gonzalo Villanueva

The following players received entry from the qualifying draw:
  Nicolás Barrientos
  Pedro Boscardin Dias
  Román Andrés Burruchaga
  Facundo Juárez
  Patrick Kypson
  Nicolás Mejía

The following player received entry as a lucky loser:
  Nicolás Álvarez

Champions

Singles

 Pedro Cachín def.  Marco Trungelliti 6–4, 2–6, 6–3.

Doubles

 Ruben Gonzales /  Reese Stalder def.  Nicolás Barrientos /  Miguel Ángel Reyes-Varela 7–6(7–5), 6–3.

References

2022 ATP Challenger Tour
2022
2022 in Dominican Republic sport
August 2022 sports events in North America